Lockerly Arboretum (50 acres) is a private, nonprofit arboretum located at 1534 Irwinton Road, Milledgeville, Georgia. It is open daily, except Sundays, without charge.

The arboretum was chartered in 1965 on the grounds of the antebellum "Lockerly" (originally "Rose Hill") mansion (1852) constructed by Judge & Mrs. Daniel R. Tucker whose grounds were influenced by their friend A. J. Downing.  In 1998, Col. Oliver N. Worley donated an additional  to the foundation for an Environmental Education facility.

The arboretum is a horticultural laboratory, with collections of azalea, camellia, conifers, holly, rhododendron, and viburnum, as well as daylily, iris, and a greenhouse for cactus and tropical plants.  The Rose Hill mansion was added to the National Register of Historic Places in 2017.

See also 
 List of botanical gardens in the United States

References 
 Guide to the Gardens of Georgia, Lilly Pinkas, Pineapple Press Inc, 2000, pages 48–50. .
 Explorer's Guide Georgia (Second Edition), Carol Thalimer, Dan Thalimer, The Countryman Press, 2012, page 297. .
 A Visitor's Guide to the Literary South, Trish Foxwell, The Countryman Press, 2013, pages 67–68. .

External links 
 Lockerly Arboretum

Arboreta in Georgia (U.S. state)
Botanical gardens in Georgia (U.S. state)
Protected areas of Baldwin County, Georgia
1965 establishments in Georgia (U.S. state)